Lava City Roller Dolls (LCRD) is a women's flat track roller derby league based in Bend, Oregon. Founded in 2006, the league currently consists of two mixed teams which compete against teams from other leagues, and an affiliated junior roller derby team for girls and boys aged 10-17. Lava City is a member of the Women's Flat Track Derby Association (WFTDA).

History
The league was founded in February 2006 by Dusty Mink, known as Psy-clone, who had friends who skated for the Rose City Rollers, and Jamie Olsen, known as Suicide Jane. It was accepted as a member of the Women's Flat Track Derby Association (WFTDA) in 2008.

In 2010, LCRD started a junior roller derby league.

WFTDA rankings

References

Sports in Bend, Oregon
Roller derby leagues established in 2006
Roller derby leagues in Oregon
Women's Flat Track Derby Association Division 3
2006 establishments in Oregon